is a Japanese track cyclist. She mounted a spirited challenge over South Africa's Tracey van Niekerk for the women's sprint gold medal at the 2007 UCI B World Championships in Cape Town, and later represented Japan at the 2008 Summer Olympics.

Tsukuda qualified for her first Japanese squad, as a 22-year-old, in the women's sprint at the 2008 Summer Olympics in Beijing by receiving a berth from the UCI "B" World Championships in Cape Town, South Africa. After grabbing the twelfth and final seed in 12.134 (an average speed of 59.337 km/h) on the morning prelims, Tsukuda lost her first round match-up to Great Britain's top medal favorite Victoria Pendleton in a spectacular fashion, finished third in her repechage heat behind Belarus' Natallia Tsylinskaya and Cuba's Lisandra Guerra, and then placed twelfth overall in a single four-rider 200 m race to round out the field.

Career highlights
2006
 6th Asian Games (Sprint), Doha (QAT)
2007
  UCI B World Championships (Keirin), Cape Town (RSA)
  UCI B World Championships (Sprint), Cape Town (RSA)
2008
 12th Olympic Games (Sprint), Beijing (CHN)
 27th UCI World Championships (Sprint), Manchester (GBR)
2013
  Japanese Track Cycling Championships (Pursuit), Japan

References

External links
NBC 2008 Olympics profile

1985 births
Living people
Japanese female cyclists
Japanese track cyclists
Cyclists at the 2008 Summer Olympics
Cyclists at the 2006 Asian Games
Olympic cyclists of Japan
People from Hokkaido
Sportspeople from Hokkaido
Asian Games competitors for Japan
20th-century Japanese women
21st-century Japanese women